This is the list of tourist attractions in Madurai, a city in Tamil Nadu state of India:

Meenakshi Temple
Aayiram Kaal Mandapam or Thousand Pillared Hall 
Vandiyur Mariamman Teppakulam
Kallazhagar temple
Thiruparankundram Murugan temple
Koodal Azhagar temple
Pazhamudircholai
Thirumalai Nayakkar Mahal
Gandhi Memorial Museum, Madurai
Thiruparankundram Dargah
Vaigai Dam
Samanar Hills
Kutladampatti Falls
Athisayam

References

Gallery

 
M
M